James L. Resseguie (born January 1, 1945, Buffalo, NY) is distinguished professor of New Testament emeritus at Winebrenner Theological Seminary, where he held the J. Russell Bucher Chair of New Testament. He received his A.B. from the University of California, Berkeley (1967), his M.Div. from Princeton Theological Seminary (1972), and his Ph.D. from Fuller Theological Seminary (1978). He is an ordained minister of the Presbyterian Church (USA). His research interests include narrative criticism, especially the elements of point of view (literature) and defamiliarization, and reader-response criticism.  He has published frequently on the application of such interpretive methods to the Gospel of Luke, Gospel of John, and the Book of Revelation.

Works

Thesis

Books

Selected chapters

 - reprinted in Character Studies in the Fourth Gospel (Grand Rapids, MI: Eerdmans, 2016), pp. 537–49.

References

Sources
 

1945 births
Living people
American biblical scholars
New Testament scholars
University of California, Berkeley alumni
Princeton Theological Seminary alumni
Fuller Theological Seminary alumni
Bible commentators